Jan Dirk Breytenbach  (born 14 July 1932) is a retired career South African Special Forces military officer and author of military books. He is best known as the first commander of 1 Reconnaissance Commando, South Africa's first special-forces unit. In his long career, he served in the Suez Crisis, the Biafran War, the South African Border War, and the Angolan Civil War, and attained the rank of colonel before his retirement.

Military career

Breytenbach attended the Army Gymnasium in 1950, and was awarded the Sword of Peace in 1953 and joined the Royal Navy Fleet Air Arm after serving in the Armoured Corps and saw service in the Suez Crisis in 1956. He rejoined the South African Defence Force in 1961 and soon after completed one of 1 Parachute Battalion's courses. Fritz Loots commissioned him to organise 1 Reconnaissance Commando in 1971.

In 1975 Breytenbach led Operation Savannah, the SADF's covert intervention in the Angolan Civil War.  The remnants of this group became the elite 32 Battalion, or "Buffalo Battalion".

He attended Staff College in 1977 and was promoted to colonel.  In 1978, led the SADF air assault on Cassinga, and has continued to the present day to contest opposing versions of the event in the press.

He became senior staff officer for operations at Northern Transvaal Command and commanded 44 Parachute Brigade from 24 September 1980 to 31 December 1982. He founded the SADF Guerilla school, which he commanded until his retirement.

Breytenbach retired from the military in 1987, and has written a number of books since then. He is the brother of South African poet and writer Breyten Breytenbach and of war correspondent/photographer Cloete Breytenbach. During the 1980s, Breyten and Jan Breytenbach held strongly opposing political viewpoints, so with his brother opting for a more left-wing approach, this influential family effectively covered the political spectrum.

Awards and decorations 
 
 
 
 
 
 
 
 
 
 
  Naval General Service Medal (United Kingdom)

Books by Jan Breytenbach

See also

 32 Battalion (Book)
 32 Battalion (South Africa)
 South African Border War

References

External links 

The Silent War – Book on SA Special Forces History 
32 Battalion Website
SA Army Website. 
Partial mirror of the old, removed official SA Special Forces Brigade site.
South African Special Forces League
 

Living people
Afrikaner people
South African people of German descent
South African Army officers
1932 births
Place of birth missing (living people)
South African writers
South African military personnel of the Border War
Fleet Air Arm personnel